

Aldberht (died  784) was a medieval Bishop of Hereford.

Aldberht was consecrated in 777 or 778 and died between 781 and 786.

Notes

Citations

References

External links
 

Bishops of Hereford
8th-century English bishops
780s deaths
Year of birth unknown